Misanthropy is the general hatred, dislike, distrust, or contempt of the human species, human behavior, or human nature. A misanthrope or misanthropist is someone who holds such views or feelings. The word originates from the Greek words μῖσος mīsos 'hatred' and ἄνθρωπος ānthropos 'man, human'. Misanthropy involves a negative evaluative attitude toward humanity that is based on mankind's flaws. Misanthropes hold that these flaws characterize all or at least the great majority of human beings and that there is no easy way to rectify them short of a complete transformation of the dominant way of life. Various types of misanthropy are distinguished in the academic literature based on what attitude is involved, at whom it is directed, and how it is expressed. Either emotions or theoretical judgments can serve as the foundation of the attitude. It can be directed at all humans without exception or exclude a few idealized people. In this regard, some misanthropes condemn themselves while others consider themselves superior to everyone else. Misanthropy is typically associated with either a destructive outlook aiming to hurt other people or an attempt to flee society. Other types of misanthropic responses include activism by trying to improve humanity, quietism in the form of resignation, and humor mocking the absurdity of the human condition.

The negative misanthropic outlook is based on different types of human flaws. Moral flaws are often seen as the main factor. They include cruelty, indifference to the suffering of others, selfishness, injustice, and greed. They may result in harm to humans and animals, like genocides and factory farming of livestock. Other flaws include intellectual flaws, like dogmatism and cognitive biases, as well as aesthetic flaws concerning ugliness and lack of sensitivity to beauty. Many debates in the academic literature discuss whether misanthropy is a valid viewpoint and what its implications are. Proponents of misanthropy usually point to human flaws and the harm they have caused as a sufficient reason for condemning humanity. Critics have responded to this line of thought by claiming that severe flaws concern only a few extreme cases, like mentally ill perpetrators, but not humanity at large. Another objection is based on the claim that humans also have virtues besides their flaws and that a balanced evaluation might be overall positive. A further criticism rejects misanthropy because of its association with hatred, which may lead to violence, and because it may make people friendless and unhappy. Defenders of misanthropy have responded by claiming that this applies only to some forms of misanthropy but not to misanthropy in general.

A related issue concerns the question of the psychological and social factors that cause people to become misanthropes. They include becoming disillusioned with someone that was adored before, socio-economic inequality, and living under an authoritarian regime. Misanthropy is relevant in various disciplines. It has been discussed and exemplified by philosophers throughout history. Examples include Heraclitus, Diogenes, Thomas Hobbes, Jean-Jacques Rousseau, Arthur Schopenhauer, and Friedrich Nietzsche. Misanthropic outlooks form part of some religious teachings discussing the deep flaws of human beings, like the Christian doctrine of original sin. Misanthropic perspectives and characters are also found in literature and popular culture. They include William Shakespeare's portrayal of Timon of Athens, Molière's play The Misanthrope, and Gulliver's Travels by Jonathan Swift. Misanthropy is closely related to but not identical to philosophical pessimism. Many misanthropes promote antinatalism, the view that humans should abstain from procreation.

Definition 
Misanthropy (a word of 17th century origin, from the Greek misanthrōpos) is traditionally defined as hatred or dislike of humankind. In contemporary philosophy, the term is usually understood in a wider sense as a negative evaluation of humanity as a whole based on humanity's vices and flaws. This negative evaluation can express itself in various forms, hatred being only one of them. In this sense, misanthropy has a cognitive component based on a negative assessment of humanity and is not just a blind rejection. Misanthropy is usually contrasted with philanthropy, which refers to the love of humankind and is associated with efforts to increase human well-being, for example, through charitable aid or donations. However, the two terms do not contradict each other and the same person may be a misanthrope in one sense and a philanthrope in another sense.

One central aspect of all forms of misanthropy is that their target is not local but ubiquitous. So the negative attitude is not just directed at some individual persons or groups of people but at humanity as a whole. This distinguishes misanthropes from racists, misogynists, and misandrists, which hold a negative attitude toward certain races or genders. So these forms of discrimination and intolerance are not general characteristics of misanthropes. It has been argued that misanthropy does not need to be universal in the sense that a person literally dislikes every human being. Instead, it depends on the person's horizon. For example, a villager who loathes every other villager without exception is a misanthrope if their horizon is limited to only this village.

Both misanthropes and their critics agree that negative features and failings are not equally distributed, i.e. that the vices and bad traits are exemplified much more strongly in some than in others. But for misanthropy, the negative assessment of humanity is not based on a few extreme and outstanding cases: it is a condemnation of humanity as a whole, including the more ordinary cases. Because of this focus on the ordinary, it is sometimes held that these flaws are obvious and open to see for everyone but people tend to ignore them or even praise them as virtues due to their intellectual flaws. Some see the flaws as part of human nature as such. Others also base their view on non-essential flaws, i.e. what humanity has come to be. This includes flaws seen as symptoms of modern civilization in general. Nevertheless, both groups agree that the relevant flaws are "entrenched". This means that there is either no or no easy way to rectify them and nothing short of a complete transformation of the dominant way of life would be required if that is possible at all.

Types 
Various types of misanthropy are distinguished in the academic literature. They are based on what attitude is involved, how it is expressed, and whether the misanthrope includes themselves in their negative assessment. The differences between them often matter for assessing whether misanthropy is a faulty and self-contradictory outlook or a respectable philosophical position. An early categorization is due to Immanuel Kant, who distinguishes between positive and negative misanthropes. Positive misanthropes are active enemies of humanity. They wish harm to other people and undertake attempts to hurt them in one form or another. Negative misanthropy, on the other hand, is a form of peaceful anthropophobia that leads people to isolate themselves. They wish others well despite seeing serious flaws in them. Kant associates negative misanthropy with moral disappointment due to previous negative experiences with others.

Another distinction focuses on whether the misanthropic condemnation of humanity is only directed at other people or at everyone including oneself. In this regard, self-inclusive misanthropes are consistent in their attitude by including themselves in their negative assessment. This type is contrasted with self-aggrandizing misanthropes, who either implicitly or explicitly exclude themselves from the general condemnation and see themselves instead as superior to everyone else. In this regard, it may be accompanied by an exaggerated sense of self-worth and self-importance. According to Joseph Harris, the self-aggrandizing type is more common even though this outlook seems to undermine its own position by constituting a form of hypocrisy. A closely related categorization is due to Irving Babbitt, who distinguishes misanthropes based on whether they allow exceptions in their negative assessment. In this regard, misanthropes of the naked intellect regard humanity as a whole as hopeless. Tender misanthropes, on the other hand, exclude a few idealized people from their negative evaluation. Babbitt cites Rousseau and his fondness for natural uncivilized man as an example of tender misanthropy and contrasts it with Swift's thorough dismissal of all of humanity.

A further way to categorize forms of misanthropy is in relation to the type of attitude involved toward humanity. In this regard, Toby Svoboda distinguishes the attitudes of dislike, hate, contempt, and judgment. A misanthrope based on dislike harbors a distaste in the form of negative feelings toward other people. Misanthropy focusing on hatred involves an intensive form of dislike that includes the additional component of wishing ill upon others and, at times, of trying to realize this wish. In the case of contempt, the attitude is not based on feelings and emotions but on a more theoretical outlook. It leads misanthropes to see other people as worthless and look down on them while excluding themselves from this assessment. If the misanthropic attitude has its foundation in judgment, it is also theoretical but does not distinguish between self and others. It is the view that humanity is in general bad without implying that the misanthrope is in any way better than the rest. According to Svoboda, only misanthropy based on judgment constitutes a serious philosophical position. Misanthropy focusing on contempt is biased against other people while misanthropy in the form of dislike and hate is difficult to assess since these emotional attitudes often do not respond to objective evidence.

Misanthropic forms of life 

Misanthropes can also be distinguished based on the form of life they use to respond to the misanthropic outlook. In this regard, misanthropy is usually not restricted to a theoretical opinion but involves an evaluative attitude that calls for a practical response. This is realized in different forms of life that come with different dominant emotions and various practical consequences for how to lead one's life. These responses to misanthropy are sometimes presented through simplified prototypes that may be too crude to accurately capture the mental life of any single person but instead aim to portray common attitudes among groups of misanthropes. The two responses most commonly associated with misanthropy involve either destruction or fleeing from society. The destructive misanthrope is said to be driven by a hatred of humankind and aims at tearing it down, with violence if necessary. For the fugitive misanthrope, fear is the dominant emotion and leads the misanthrope to seek a secluded place in order to avoid the corrupting contact with civilization and humanity as much as possible.

The contemporary misanthropic literature has also identified further less-known types of misanthropic lifestyles. The activist misanthrope is driven by hope despite their negative appraisal of humanity. This hope is a form of meliorism based on the idea that it is possible and feasible for humanity to transform itself and the activist tries to realize this ideal. A weaker version of this approach is to try to improve the world incrementally to avoid some of the worst outcomes without the hope of fully solving the fundamental problem. The quietist misanthrope, on the other hand, takes a pessimistic approach toward what the individual can do for bringing about a transformation or significant improvements. In contrast to the more drastic reactions of the other responses mentioned, they resign themselves to quiet acceptance and small-scale avoidance. A further approach is focused on humor based on mockery and ridicule at the absurdity of the human condition, for example, because humans hurt each other and risk future self-destruction for trivial concerns like a marginal increase in profit. This way, humor can act both as a mirror to portray the terrible truth of the situation and as its palliative at the same time.

Forms of human flaws 
A core aspect of misanthropy is that its negative attitude toward humanity is based on human flaws. Various misanthropes have provided extensive lists of flaws, including cruelty, greed, selfishness, wastefulness, dogmatism, self-deception, and insensitivity to beauty. These flaws can be categorized in many ways. It is often held that moral flaws constitute the most serious case. Other flaws discussed in the contemporary literature include intellectual flaws, aesthetic flaws, and spiritual flaws.

Moral flaws are often identified with tendencies to promote what is bad or with inappropriate attitudes toward values. They include cruelty, indifference to the suffering of others, selfishness, moral laziness,  cowardice, injustice, greed, and ingratitude. The harm done because of these flaws can be divided into three categories: harm done directly to humans, harm done directly to other animals, and harm done indirectly to both humans and animals by harming the environment. Examples of these categories include the Holocaust, factory farming of livestock, and pollution causing climate change. In this regard, it is not just relevant that human beings cause these forms of harm but also that they are morally responsible for them. This is based on the idea that they can understand the consequences of their actions and could act differently. However, they decide not to, for example, because they ignore the long-term well-being of others in order to get short-term personal benefits.

Intellectual flaws concern cognitive capacities. They can be defined as what leads to false beliefs, what obstructs knowledge, or what violates the demands of rationality. They include intellectual vices, like arrogance, wishful thinking, dogmatism, stupidity, and gullibility, as well as cognitive biases, like the confirmation bias, the self-serving bias, the hindsight bias, and the anchoring bias. Intellectual flaws can work in tandem with all kinds of vices: they may deceive someone about having a certain vice and thereby prevent them from addressing it and improving themself, for example, by being mindless and failing to recognize their flaws. They also include forms of self-deceit, wilful ignorance, and being in denial about something. Similar considerations have prompted some traditions to see intellectual failings, like ignorance, as the root of all evil.

Aesthetic flaws are usually not given the same importance as moral and intellectual flaws, but they also carry some weight for misanthropic considerations. These flaws relate to beauty and ugliness. They concern ugly aspects of human life itself, like defecation and aging, ugliness caused by human activities, like pollution and litter, and inappropriate attitudes toward aesthetic aspects, like being insensitive to beauty.

Psychological and social causes 
Various psychological and social factors have been identified in the academic literature as possible causes of misanthropic sentiments. The individual factors by themselves may not be able to fully explain misanthropy but can show instead how it becomes more likely. For example, it is often argued that undergoing disappointments and disillusionments in life increases the tendency to adopt a misanthropic outlook. In this regard, the more idealistic and optimistic the person initially was, the stronger this reversal and the following negative outlook tend to be. This type of psychological explanation is already found in Plato's Phaedo. In it, Socrates explains that misanthropy arises when a person trusts and admires someone without knowing them sufficiently well. If it is then discovered later that the admired person has serious flaws, the initial attitude may be reversed and universalized to apply to all others. This leads to general distrust and contempt toward other humans. It becomes more likely if the admired person is a close friend and if it happens more than once. This form of misanthropy may be accompanied by a feeling of moral superiority in which the misanthrope considers themselves to be better than everyone else. Other types of negative personal experiences in life may have a similar effect. Andrew Gibson uses this line of thought to explain why some philosophers became misanthropes. In the case of Thomas Hobbes, he discusses the politically unstable environment and the frequent wars which Hobbes had to live through. For Arthur Schopenhauer, he cites the fact that Schopenhauer was forced to flee from his home at the age of five and never found a place to call home afterward. Another psychological factor is associated with negative attitudes toward the human body, especially in the form of general revulsion from sexuality.

Besides the psychological causes, some wider social circumstances may also play a role. Generally speaking, the more negative the circumstances are, the more likely misanthropy becomes. For example, it has been argued that socio-economic inequality in the form of unfair distribution of wealth increases the tendency to adopt a misanthropic perspective. This has to do with the fact that inequality tends to undermine trust in the government and others. It may be possible to overcome or reduce this source of misanthropy by implementing policies that build trust and promote a more equal distribution of wealth. The political regime is another relevant factor. This specifically concerns authoritarian regimes using all means available to repress their population and stay in power. For example, it has been argued that the severe forms of repression of the Ancien Régime in the late 17th century made it more likely for people to adopt a misanthropic outlook because their freedom was denied. Democracy, on the other hand, may have the opposite effect since it allows more personal freedom due to its more optimistic outlook on human nature. 

Empirical studies often use questions related to trust in other people to measure misanthropy. This concerns specifically whether the individual believes that others would be fair and helpful. In an empirical study on misanthropy in American society, Tom W. Smith concludes that factors associated with an increased misanthropic outlook are low socioeconomic status, being from racial and ethnic minorities, and having experienced recent negative events in one's life. In regard to religion, misanthropy is higher for people who do not attend church and for fundamentalists. Certain factors seem to play no significant role, like gender, having undergone a divorce, and never having been married. Another study by Morris Rosenberg finds that misanthropy is associated with certain political outlooks, like being skeptical about free speech and a tendency to support authoritarian policies, for example, to suppress certain political and religious liberties. However, there seems to be no clear link to many of the broader political outlooks, like being a Democrat rather than a Republican or being a liberal rather than a conservative.

Arguments for and against 
Various discussions in the academic literature concern the question of whether misanthropy is an accurate assessment of humanity and what the consequences of adopting it are. Many proponents of misanthropy focus on the different forms of human flaws together with examples of when they exercise their negative influences. They argue that these flaws are so severe that misanthropy is an appropriate response. Special importance in this regard is usually given to moral faults. This is based on the idea that humans do not merely cause a great deal of suffering and destruction but are also morally responsible for them. The reason is that they are intelligent enough to understand the consequences of their actions and could potentially make balanced long-term decisions instead of focusing on personal short-term gains. Opponents of misanthropy often respond to the different examples by claiming that they are extreme individual manifestations of human flaws, either by mentally ill perpetrators or by normal people under extreme circumstances. In this regard, the negative cases do not reflect on humanity at large and therefore are unable to justify the misanthropic attitude. So while there are cases of extreme human brutality, like the mass killings committed by dictators and their forces, listing such cases is not sufficient for condemning humanity at large. Misanthropes have responded to this type of argument in various ways. Some hold that the underlying flaws are there in everyone, even if they reach their most extreme manifestation only in a few. Others claim that many ordinary people are complicit in their manifestation, for example, by supporting the political leaders committing them, even if they did not directly commit them. Another approach is to focus not on the grand extreme cases but on the ordinary small-scale manifestations of human flaws in everyday life, such as lying, cheating, breaking promises, and being ungrateful.

A closely related defense of misanthropy is based on the actual damage caused by humans in the past. In this regard, Svoboda presents a thought experiment involving the discovery of a fully established ecosystem on another planet. This ecosystem is in harmony except for a single species that dominates it and causes one ecological catastrophe after another resulting in mass extinctions of other species. Svoboda argues that having a negative attitude toward this species is the appropriate response and that this case accurately reflects the role of human beings on Earth. An objection to this line of thought is that the negative assessment should not be directed at humanity but at certain social forces, like capitalism, fascism, religious fundamentalism, or imperialism, which are seen as the main cause of many tragedies. On this view, the proper attitude would be anti-capitalism or a similar outlook but not misanthropy. Svoboda rejects this argument by claiming that these forces do not have a life of their own but depend on human beings to manifest them. In this regard, these forces are just different ways in which the negative value of humanity is enacted.

A different problem for arguments based on human flaws is that they present just one side of humanity while evaluative attitudes should take all sides into account. So it may be the case that despite having very serious vices, humans may also possess equally important virtues that make up for their shortcomings. For example, accounts that focus only on the great wars, cruelties, and tragedies in human history ignore its positive achievements in the sciences, arts, and humanities. And the focus on negative exemplars, like Stalin or Hitler, should be contrasted with positive exemplars, like Mother Teresa or Gandhi. While it is difficult to make such comparisons on a large scale, misanthropes have argued that at least for important subfields, like man's treatment of animals, the scales are tipped against man. Misanthropes often argue that positive achievements are rare exceptions while negative consequences are much more widespread. Another argument favoring misanthropy, sometimes referred to as the asymmetry thesis, holds that morally bad actions carry more weight on an ethical level than their good counterparts. In this regard, a person cannot simply make up for the cold murders they committed by saving a few lives.

Some objections to misanthropy are based not on whether this attitude appropriately reflects the negative value of humanity but on the costs of accepting such a position, for the individual and for society at large. This is especially relevant if misanthropy is associated with hatred, which may turn easily into violence against social institutions and other humans and may result in a lot of harm. Misanthropy may also deprive the individual of most pleasures by making them miserable and friendless. Defenders have argued that misanthropy is not necessarily connected to hatred, violence, and friendlessness. So these criticisms may be valid for forms of misanthropy focused on hatred and destruction but miss their target for other forms based on a peaceful and theoretical outlook. A closely related criticism holds that misanthropy is morally objectable. This argument may be valid for many individual misanthropes but it has been argued that misanthropy is not necessarily in conflict with obeying the demands of morality. An example of this would be Kant's "cold-hearted benefactor", who fulfills all their moral requirements toward other people despite lacking real sympathy. 

Another form of criticism focuses more on the theoretical level and claims that misanthropy is an inconsistent and self-contradictory position that amounts at best to a "proto-philosophy or sub-philosophy". This inconsistency shows itself, for example, in the misanthrope's tendency to denounce the social world while still being engaged in it and being unable to fully leave it behind. This criticism applies specifically to misanthropes who exclude themselves from the negative evaluation and look down on others with contempt from an arrogant position of inflated ego. But it may not apply to all types of misanthropy. A closely related objection is based on the claim that misanthropy is an unnatural attitude and should therefore be seen as an aberration or a pathological case.

In various disciplines

Philosophy 
Misanthropy has been discussed and exemplified by philosophers throughout history. One of the earliest cases was the pre-Socratic philosopher Heraclitus. He is often characterized as a loner who had little patience for human society. A central factor to his negative outlook on human beings was their lack of comprehension of the true nature of reality. This concerns especially cases in which they remain in a state of ignorance despite having received a thorough explanation of the issue in question. Another early discussion is found in Plato's Phaedo, where misanthropy is characterized as the result of frustrated expectations and excessively naïve optimism.

Various strands of misanthropy are also found in the cynic school of philosophy. There it is argued, for example, that humans keep on reproducing and multiplying the evils they are attempting to flee. For example, they move to cities to defend themselves against outsiders. But this process thwarts their initial goal by leading to even more violence due to high crime rates within the city. Diogenes is a well-known cynic misanthrope. He saw other people as hypocritical and superficial. He openly rejected all kinds of societal norms and values, often provoking others by consciously breaking conventions and behaving rudely.

Thomas Hobbes is an example of misanthropy in early modern philosophy. His negative outlook on humanity is reflected in many of his works. For him, humans are egoistic and violent: they act according to their self-interest and are willing to pursue their goals at the expense of others. In their natural state, this leads to a never-ending war in which "every man to every man ... is an enemy". He saw the establishment of an authoritative state characterized by the strict enforcement of laws to maintain order as the only way to tame the violent human nature and avoid perpetual war.

A different type of misanthropy is found in Jean-Jacques Rousseau. He idealizes the harmony and simplicity found in nature and contrasts them with the confusion and disorder found in humanity, especially in the form of society and institutions. For example, in a famous statement, he claims that "Man is born free; and everywhere he is in chains". This negative outlook was also reflected in his lifestyle: he lived solitary and preferred to be with plants rather than humans.

Arthur Schopenhauer is often mentioned as a prime example of misanthropy. According to him, everything in the world, including humans and their activities, is an expression of one underlying will. However, this will is blind, which causes it to continuously engage in futile struggles. On the level of human life, this "presents itself as a continual deception" since it is driven by pointless desires. They are mostly egoistic and often result in injustice and suffering to others. Once they are satisfied, they only give rise to new pointless desires and more suffering. In this regard, Schopenhauer dismisses most things that are typically considered precious or meaningful in human life, like romantic love, individuality, and liberty. He holds that the best response to the human condition is a form of asceticism by denying the expression of the will. However, this is only found in very rare humans and "the dull majority of men" does not live up to this ideal.

Friedrich Nietzsche, who was strongly influenced by Schopenhauer, is also often cited as an example of misanthropy. He saw man as a decadent and "sick animal" that constitutes no progress over other animals. He even had a negative image of apes since they are more similar to human beings than other animals, for example, in regard to cruelty. For Nietzsche, a noteworthy flaw of human beings is their tendency to create and enforce systems of moral rules that favor weak people and suppress true greatness. He held that the human being is something to be overcome and replaced by what he calls the Übermensch.

Religion 

Some misanthropic views are also found in religious teachings. In Christianity, for example, this is associated with the sinful nature of humans and the widespread manifestation of sin in everyday life. Common forms of sin are discussed in terms of the seven deadly sins, such as an excessive sense of self-importance in the form of pride, strong sexual cravings constituting lust, and following greed for material possessions as well as being envious of the possessions of others. According to the doctrine of original sin, this flaw is found in every human being since human nature is already tainted by sin from birth by inheriting it from Adam and Eve's rebellion against God's authority.

Misanthropic perspectives can also be discerned in various Buddhist teachings. For example, Buddha had a very negative outlook on the widespread flaws of human beings, including lust, hatred, delusion, sorrow, and despair. These flaws are identified with some form of craving or attachment (taṇhā) and cause suffering (dukkha). Buddhists hold that it is possible to overcome these failings in the process of achieving Buddhahood or enlightenment. However, this is seen as an extremely difficult and rare achievement. In this regard, most human beings carry these deep flaws with them throughout their life.

However, there are also many religious teachings opposed to misanthropy, such as the emphasis on kindness and helping others. In Christianity, this is found in the concept of agape, which involves selfless and unconditional love in the form of compassion and a willingness to help others. Buddhists see the practice of loving kindness (metta) as a central aspect that implies a positive attitude of compassion toward humans and all other sentient beings.

Literature and popular culture 
Many examples of misanthropy are also found in literature and popular culture. Timon of Athens by William Shakespeare is a famous portrayal of the life of the Ancient Greek Timon, who is widely known for his extreme misanthropic attitude. Shakespeare depicts him as a wealthy and generous gentleman. However, he becomes disillusioned with his ungrateful friends and humanity at large. This way, his initial philanthropy turns into an unrestrained hatred of humanity, which prompts him to leave society in order to live in a forest. Molière's play The Misanthrope is another famous example. Its protagonist, Alceste, has a very low opinion of the people around him. He tends to focus on their flaws and openly criticizes them for their superficiality, insincerity, and hypocrisy. He rejects most social conventions and thereby often offends others, for example, by refusing to engage in social niceties like polite small talk.

The author Jonathan Swift had a reputation for being misanthropic. In some statements, he openly declares that he hates and detests "that animal called man". Misanthropy is also found in many of his works. For example, Gulliver's Travels tells the adventures of the protagonist Gulliver, who journeys to various places, like an island inhabited by tiny people and a land ruled by intelligent horses. Through these experiences of the contrast between humans and other species, he comes to see more and more the deep flaws of humanity, leading him to develop a revulsion toward other human beings. Ebenezer Scrooge from Charles Dickens's A Christmas Carol is an often-cited example of misanthropy. He is described as a cold-hearted, solitary miser who detests Christmas. He is greedy, selfish, and has no regard for the well-being of others. Other writers associated with misanthropy include Gustave Flaubert and Philip Larkin.

Mr. Burns from the TV show The Simpsons is a more recent example of misanthropy. He is one of the main antagonists and his main desire is to increase his already enormous wealth and power. He is ruthless in pursuing this goal and has no regard for the safety and well-being of others in the process. An even darker form of misanthropy is found in the character the Joker from the DC Universe. He is one of the main antagonists of Batman and acts as an agent of chaos. He believes that people are selfish, cruel, irrational, and hypocritical. He is usually portrayed as a sociopath with a twisted sense of humor who uses violent means to expose and bring down organized society.

Related concepts

Philosophical pessimism 
Misanthropy is closely related to but not identical with philosophical pessimism. Philosophical pessimism is the view that life as a whole is not worth living or that the world in general is a bad place, for example, because it is meaningless and full of suffering. This view is perhaps best exemplified by Arthur Schopenhauer, or in its most extreme form, Philipp Mainländer. Philosophical pessimism is often accompanied by misanthropy by holding that humanity is also bad and maybe partially responsible for the badness of the world. But the two views do not entail each other and can be held separately. A non-misanthropic pessimist may hold, for example, that humans are just victims of a terrible world but not to blame for it. Eco-misanthropists, on the other hand, may claim that the world and its nature are valuable but for the negative, destructive influence of humanity.

Antinatalism and human extinction 

Antinatalism is the view that coming into existence is bad and that humans, therefore, have a duty to abstain from procreation. A central argument for antinatalism is the so-called misanthropic argument. It sees the deep flaws of humans and their tendency to cause harm as a reason for avoiding to create more humans. These harms include wars, genocides, factory farming, and damages done to the environment. This argument contrasts with philanthropic arguments, which focus on the future suffering of the human about to come into existence. They argue that the only way to avoid their future suffering is to prevent them from being born. The Voluntary Human Extinction Movement and the Church of Euthanasia are well-known examples of  social movements in favor of antinatalism and human extinction.

Antinatalism is commonly endorsed by misanthropic thinkers. But there are also many other ways that could lead to the extinction of the human species. This field is still relatively speculative but various suggestions have been made about threats to the long-term survival of the human species. An often-discussed scenario involves the outbreak of a worldwide nuclear war leaving Earth uninhabitable. Another threat is posed by advances in nano-technology, which may at some point lead to the development of self-replicating nanorobots that could get out of control. In the field of medicine, scientific advances could be used to create a deadly super-pathogen that could spread rapidly. While such cases are usually seen as terrible scenarios and dangerous threats, misanthropes may instead interpret them as reasons for hope that the abhorrent age of humanity in history may soon come to an end. A similar sentiment is expressed by Bertrand Russell, who states in relation to the existence of human life on earth and its misdeeds that they are "a passing nightmare; in time the earth will become again incapable of supporting life, and peace will return."

Human exceptionalism and deep ecology 
Human exceptionalism is the claim that human beings have unique importance and are exceptional compared to all other species. It is often based on the claim that they stand out because of their special capacities, like intelligence, rationality, and autonomy. In religious contexts, it is frequently explained in relation to a unique role that God foresaw for them or that they were created in God's image. Human exceptionalism is usually combined with the claim that human well-being matters more than the well-being of other species. This line of thought can be used to draw various ethical conclusions, for example, that humans have the right to rule the planet and impose their will on other species or that inflicting harm on other species may be morally acceptable if it is done with the purpose of promoting human well-being and excellence. Generally speaking, the position of human exceptionalism is at odds with misanthropy since their outlooks on the value of humanity are in many ways diametrically opposed.  Nonetheless, it has been argued that this is not necessarily the case and it is possible to hold both positions at the same time. One way to do this is to claim that humanity is exceptional mainly due to a few rare individuals while maintaining a negative perspective toward the average person. Another approach is to turn human exceptionalism on its head by claiming that human beings are exceptional in a negative sense, i.e. that, given their destructive and harmful history, they are much worse than any other species.

Theorists in the field of deep ecology are also often critical of human exceptionalism and tend to favor a misanthropic perspective. Deep ecology is a philosophical and social movement that emphasizes the inherent value of nature and advocates a radical change in human behavior toward nature. Various theorists have criticized deep ecology based on the claim that it is misanthropic by privileging other species over humans. For example, the deep ecology movement Earth First! has faced severe criticism when they praised the AIDS epidemic in Africa as a solution to the problem of human overpopulation in their newsletter.

See also 

 Asociality – lack of motivation to engage in social interaction
 Antisocial – disregard for, and violation of, the rights of others
 Antihumanism – rejection of humanism
 Cosmicism
 Emotional isolation
 Hatred (video game)
 Machiavellianism (psychology)
 Nihilism
 Social alienation

References

Works cited

External links

 
Anti-social behaviour
Human behavior
Philosophical concepts
Philosophy of life
Psychological attitude
Social emotions